The first season (2014–2015) of the Turkish TV series, Diriliş: Ertuğrul, created by Mehmet Bozdağ precedes the second season of the Diriliş: Ertuğrul and the first season of the historical drama television series premiered on  and concluded on .

Plot 
Süleyman Şah, Bey of the Kayı sends his son, Ertuğrul, to ask for land from the Emir of Aleppo. This is made almost impossible when the Kayı are put in a series of problems with the Templars after saving Şehzade Numan, Halime Sultan, and Şehzade Yiğit because of the traitor in the Emir's palace, Nasir, who works for the Templars but is later killed by Ertuğrul and the truth is shown to the Emir. A brand new problem also arises with Kurdoğlu, Süleyman Şah's brother, who seeks his brother's Beylik with the help of Selcan Hatun, Ertuğrul's sister-in-law and adoptive sister, who wants revenge from Süleyman Şah as he killed her treacherous father, Alptekin Bey. Ertuğrul, who loves Halime, marries her after much difficulty. Selcan's husband, Gündoğdu becomes jealous of his brother Ertuğrul as he is respected as the tribe hero but gradually calms down. Towards the end of the season, Kurdoğlu is beheaded, Ertuğrul successfully defeats the Templars and captures their castle, and Selcan repents. This is followed by Süleyman Şah's death and the tribe's migration to Erzurum as part of Süleyman Şah's will before he died.

Production 

Preparations for season 1 began in February 2014. In five months, the stories and drawings were ready. Gambat from Mongolia had drawings made in three months. The teams started their work in May 2014. The decoration and art team consisted of sixty people and worked for 4 months for the first episode. 4000 square metres of fabric were used for costumes and decor. As for the choreography of the show, Nomad, the special choreography crew of movies such as The Expendables 2, 47 Ronin, and Conan the Barbarian, from Kazakhstan, was invited to Turkey. The crew prepared special choreographies for actors, horses, and other scenes. The cast took riding, sword fighting, and archery lessons for 3 months. There were 25 horses on the set, attended by a veterinarian, who specially trained them. All are maintained on a horse farm in Riva. A special area similar to a zoo (but on a smaller scale) was created for all the animals which appear in the show, which include gazelles, sheep, goats, nightingales and partridges. The shooting time of the first episode was about a month.

Season one was filmed around Beykoz and Riva in Istanbul. Diriliş: Ertuğrul set up two plateaus for Riva and Beykoz Kundura Factory for the first season. The plateau in Riva was erected on a total area of 40,000 m² with 35 tents built according to the original. In the Beykoz Kundura factory, Aleppo, Aleppo Palace, supply room, guest rooms, corridors, dungeons, Karatoygar room, Seljuk pavilion, temple halls, and rooms, lodges, and tent interiors were built on a closed area of 6,000 m². In the Kundura factory, the Aleppo Bazaar, the interior of the fortress, the interior of the tent by Süleyman Şah, the dungeon, the corridor, and the altar of the temple were built on an open area of 5,000 m².

Cast

Main characters 
 Engin Altan Düzyatan as Ertuğrul
  as Kurdoğlu Bey
 Hülya Darcan as Hayme Ana
 Serdar Gökhan as Süleyman Şah
 Esra Bilgiç as Halime Sultan
  as Titus
 Cengiz Coşkun as Turgut Alp
 Didem Balçın as Selcan Hatun
 Kaan Taşaner as Gündoğdu Bey

Supporting characters 
 Cavit Çetin Güner as Doğan Alp
 Nurettin Sönmez as Bamsı Beyrek
 Hande Subaşı as Aykız Hatun
 Burcu Kıratlı as Gökçe Hatun
  Üstad-ı Azam Petruccio Manzini
  as Deli Demir
 Ozman Sirgood as İbn-i Arabi
 Mehmet İnci as Emir El Aziz
 Arda Anarat as Dündar Bey
 Reshad Strik as Ömer Alp (formerly Claudius)

Minor characters 
  as Afşin Bey
  as Şehzade Numan
 Burak Temiz as Şehzade Yiğit
  as Kara Toygar
 Tolga Sala as Hamza Alp
 Gökhan Karacık, Derviş İshak
 Celal Al as Abdurrahman Alp
 Atilla Engin as Kardinal Thomas 
 Burak Çimen as Nâsır
  as Eftelya
 Fahri Öztezcan as İlyas Fakıh
 Sedat Erdiş as Alpargu Bey
 Dilek Serbest as İzadora
 Gökhan Atalay as Atabey Şahabettin Tuğrul
 Hamit Demir as Akçakoca Bey
 Büşra Çubukçuoğlu as Leyla Sultan
 Ayşegül İşsever as Dadı Ümmülhayr (El Aziz's aunt)
 Özlem Aydın as Elenora
 İskender Altın as Ömer (formerly Giovanni)
 Melikşah Özen as Melikşah Alp

Guest characters 
 Zafer Altun as Baybora
 Hüseyin Özay as Korkut Bey
 Kıvanç Kılıç as Aykutlu
 Birand Tunca as Bisol
 Diler Öztürk as Alptekin Bey

Episodes

References

External links 
 

Diriliş:_Ertuğrul_and_Kuruluş:_Osman
2014 television seasons